Steve Mills (born in 1957 in Marion, Ohio) is an American juggler and unicyclist from Morristown, New Jersey. He is the inventor of the "Mills' Mess" juggling pattern. Mills was taught to juggle by Ron Graham, a juggler and mathematician.

The Dazzling Mills Family
In 1978, Steve married Carol Sue Haines. They began performing a juggling and unicycle act, later accompanied by their children Michelle and Anthony. Together the group became known as The Dazzling Mills Family.

They have performed at venues such as Harlem Globetrotters basketball games, the Arnold Fitness Expo, fairs, and schools.
Television appearances include PM Magazine, The Statler Brothers Show, The Penn and Teller Show, Daily Planet, Most Daring, Smoking Gun Presents, and The Shotgun Red Variety Show.

Carol stopped performing in 2004 because of a nerve disorder. Kris Groth, who married Michelle in 2009, joined the group in 2008. In 2011, a baby girl, Chloe, was born to Kris and Michelle. In 2014, the group's web site stopped advertising for the group and was moved to advertising Steve as a solo act. The web site subsequently went dark in late 2017.

Awards
Steve Mills was a winner of the International Jugglers' Association Championships in 1975, 1976 and 1978.

References

External links
 The Dazzling Mills Family YouTube channel

Living people
1957 births
Jugglers
Unicyclists